Kieran Mullan (born 6 June 1984) is a British Conservative Party politician who was elected as the Member of Parliament (MP) for Crewe and Nantwich at the 2019 general election.

Early life and career
Mullan was born in 1984. He grew up in social housing. His mother is a nurse and his father is a policeman. Mullan studied medicine at the Leeds School of Medicine. In 2008, he was an account executive for the public relations firm Weber Shandwick. From 2009 to 2013, he worked for the advocacy group Patients Association. In 2013, he contributed to a government review into the NHS Hospitals complaints system. The following year, Mullan founded the charity ValueYou in Ealing, London which aimed to recognise volunteers. He has also worked as a volunteer special constable for four years and as an emergency medicine doctor.

Political career
Mullan unsuccessfully contested elections for two seats in the Midlands: Birmingham Hodge Hill in 2015, and Wolverhampton South East in 2017.

He was selected as the Conservative candidate for the Crewe and Nantwich seat in September 2018. At the time of his selection Mullan was a clinical lead at the Healthcare Quality Improvement Partnership. He won the marginal seat for the Conservatives, defeating the incumbent Labour Party MP Laura Smith, by 8,508 votes. It was thought that pro-Brexit sentiment in the constituency contributed to the win. During his election victory speech he said he would "speak up for, and work for, staff" at the NHS and increase the number of GPs.

Mullan has been a member of the Justice Select Committee since March 2020. In 2020, while serving as an MP, he returned to his role as a doctor to volunteer during the COVID-19 pandemic.

Personal life
Mullan is gay.

References

External links

Living people
Conservative Party (UK) MPs for English constituencies
UK MPs 2019–present
English LGBT politicians
LGBT members of the Parliament of the United Kingdom
Gay politicians
1984 births